Soloway, Solloway is a Russian and Jewish surname of Russian language origin (Russian: Соловей, "Nightingale"; Yiddish: סולוביי). Variants include Solovey, Solovay, Solovyei, Solovei, Salovey, etc. Notable people with these surnames include:

Soloway or Solloway
 Amanda Solloway (born 1961), British Conservative Party politician (MP 2015–2017)
 Faith Soloway (born 1964), American folk rock musician
 Joey Soloway (born 1965), American television showrunner and writer
 Larry Solway (born 1928), Canadian actor and broadcaster
 Paul Soloway (1941–2007), American bridge champion
 Robert Soloway (born 1980), American founder of Newport Internet Marketing and convicted originator of spam

Solovey, Solovei, etc.
 Andrey Solovey (born 1994), Belarusian footballer
 Artsyom Salavey (born 1990), Belarusian footballer
 Dmytro Solovey (born 1993), Ukrainian Paralympic judoka
 Hanna Solovey (born 1992), Ukrainian racing cyclist
 Mikhail Solovey (born 1980), Russian footballer
 Peter Salovey (born 1958), American social psychologist and President of Yale University
 Robert M. Solovay (born 1938), American mathematician
 Sarah Solovay (born 1994), American singer-songwriter
 Valery Solovei (born 1960), Russian historian
 Yelena Solovey (born 1947), American actress

Fictional characters
 Georgie Soloway, main character in the 1971 film Who Is Harry Kellerman and Why Is He Saying Those Terrible Things About Me?
 Solovei the Brigand, a figure in Slavic folklore

See also
 Soloveitchik, a surname
 Solovyov, a surname
 Solvay (disambiguation)
 Solway (disambiguation)

East Slavic-language surnames
Yiddish-language surnames